Capital punishment has been abolished in Benin. It was abolished in 2016, as a result of a Constitutional Court of Benin ruling.

Benin last executed in 1987. Before the court decision, Benin was classified as "Abolitionist in Practice."

References

Benin
Law of Benin